Annie Barnes may refer to:

 Annie Barnes (academic) (1903–2003), Swiss-English academic of French literature
 Annie Barnes (suffragist) (1886–1982), British socialist and suffragist
 Annie Maria Barnes (1857–?), American journalist, editor and author